My Hero Academia is a Japanese anime television series based on the manga series of the same name by Kōhei Horikoshi. The anime television series adaptation produced by Bones was announced in Weekly Shōnen Jump on October 29, 2015. The series is directed by Kenji Nagasaki, written by Yōsuke Kuroda, featured character designs by Yoshihiko Umakoshi who also served as the chief animation director, and music composed by Yuki Hayashi. The story follows Izuku Midoriya, a boy born without superpowers in a world where they are the norm, but who still dreams of becoming a superhero himself, and is scouted by the world's greatest hero, All Might, who shares his powers with Izuku after recognizing his value and enrolls him in a prestigious high school for superheroes in training.

The series' premiere aired from April 3 to June 26, 2016, on TBS, MBS and other Japan News Network stations in 'Nichigo' time slot at 5 P.M. on Sundays in Japan. The second season aired from April 1 to September 30, 2017, on NTV and YTV, with the staff and cast from the first season returning to reprise their roles. The third season aired from April 7 to September 29, 2018. The fourth season aired from October 12, 2019, to April 4, 2020. The fifth season aired from March 27 to September 25, 2021. The sixth season premiered on October 1, 2022. The series has featured twenty-two different credits theme songs: eleven opening themes and eleven ending themes.

The series is licensed in North America, United Kingdom and Ireland by Funimation, and streamed on FunimationNow, Crunchyroll and Hulu. Universal Pictures, Sony Pictures and Manga Entertainment distributes the series in the United Kingdom and Ireland. Universal Sony Pictures Home Entertainment and Madman Anime are simulcasting the series in Australia and New Zealand. Medialink licensed the series in Southeast Asia. In April 2018, it was announced that the series' English dub would air on Adult Swim's Toonami programming block starting on May 5, 2018.

Series overview

Episode list

Season 1 (2016)

Season 2 (2017)

Season 3 (2018)

Season 4 (2019–20)

Season 5 (2021)

Season 6 (2022–23)

OVAs
An original video animation (OVA) titled "Save! Rescue Training!" was shown at the Jump Festa '16 event on November 27, 2016, and released on April 4, 2017 which bundled with the limited edition of the 13th volume of the manga. A second OVA was released on June 2, 2017, bundled with a limited edition of the 14th volume of the manga. It focuses on a joint practice session between Izuku's class and the other hero department students at U.A. Academy. A third OVA, "All Might: Rising," was released on February 13, 2019. It was bundled with the first film's blu-ray set, and adapted its prequel manga. It was two minutes long. A two-part original net animation (ONA) titled "Make It! Do-or-Die Survival Training," were released on August 16, 2020, with the returning staff and cast from season 4; they were streamed simultaneously by Funimation from the Japanese release. An OVA, "Departure," was released on February 16, 2022. It follows Midoriya, Bakugo, and Todoroki as they encounter Hawks in an airport terminal. Two new OVA episodes, were given screenings in Japan from June 16–19, 2022. Internationally, Crunchyroll premiered the episodes at Anime Expo on July 1, 2022. A worldwide streaming release premiered on August 1, 2022.

Home video release

Japanese

English

Notes

References

External links
 My Hero Academia at Crunchyroll
 

Lists of anime episodes
My Hero Academia episode lists